Blink-182 / No Doubt Summer Tour 2004 was a concert tour co-headlined by American rock bands Blink-182 and No Doubt. Launched in support of Blink-182's eponymous fifth studio album and No Doubt's The Singles 1992–2003, the tour took place in the summer of 2004 and saw the two Southern California groups travel to US amphitheatres.

Background
The tour kicked off in Indianapolis on June 1, 2004 and completed in Southern California in San Bernardino at the Hyundai Pavilion on June 26, 2004.

Although many venues were at the time operated by Clear Channel Entertainment, individual promoter deals were cut in each market by agents Mitch Okmin at the M.O.B. Agency (No Doubt) and Darryl Eaton at CAA (Blink-182). The summer dates were worked around No Doubt singer Gwen Stefani's work on an Interscope solo record (Love. Angel. Music. Baby.), and her role in the Martin Scorsese film The Aviator (2004). "I was like, 'Gwen, can you give me three weeks?'" said Jim Guerinot, manager of No Doubt for Rebel Waltz, to Billboard. "I would have loved to have had a whole summer of this tour."

Setlists

Blink-182

"Feeling This"
"Easy Target"
"What's My Age Again?"
"Violence"
"The Rock Show"
"Obvious"
"I Miss You"
"Asthenia"
"Adam's Song"
"First Date"
"Go"
"Stay Together for the Kids"
"Dumpweed" / "M+M's" / "Josie" / "Man Overboard"
"Reckless Abandon"
"All the Small Things"
"Down"
"The Fallen Interlude" / Travis Barker drum solo
"Stockholm Syndrome"
"Dammit"

No Doubt

"Just a Girl"
"Excuse Me Mr."
"Ex-Girlfriend"
"Underneath It All"
"Hey Baby"
"Bathwater"
"Running"
"Simple Kind of Life" (acoustic)
"Hella Good"
"New"
"Don't Speak"
"It's My Life"
"Spiderwebs"

Encore
"Sunday Morning"

Tour dates

Reception
Joe D'Angelo of MTV News considered No Doubt's performance largely better than Blink's, writing that "The audience here was wholly under [Gwen Stefani's] spell, given that on this particular night, No Doubt were the best show in town, even if Blink played one hell of a concert."

Notes

External links
 Official Blink-182 website
 Official No Doubt website

2004 concert tours
Blink-182 concert tours
Co-headlining concert tours
No Doubt concert tours